The Best MMA Fighter ESPY Award is an annual award honoring the achievements of an individual from the world of mixed martial arts. The Best MMA Fighter ESPY Award trophy is presented to the mixed martial arts fighter adjudged to be the best in a given calendar year at the annual ESPY Awards ceremony. It was first awarded as part of the ESPY Awards in 2019, succeeding the Best Fighter ESPY Award, which encompassed both boxers and MMA fighters.

The inaugural winner of the Best MMA Fighter ESPY Award was American UFC Heavyweight Champion Daniel Cormier, who won and defended the championship in 2018.

Winners and nominees

References

External links
 

ESPY Awards
Awards established in 2019